Pat Ballage (born April 8, 1964) is a former American football defensive back  of the National Football League. He played safety for the Indianapolis Colts from 1986 to 1987.

References

1964 births
Living people
American football defensive backs
Notre Dame Fighting Irish football players
Dallas Cowboys players
Indianapolis Colts players